Vanitas is a type of symbolic work of art.

Vanitas may also refer to:
 Vanitas (Macbeth album) (2001)
 Vanitas (Anaal Nathrakh album) (2012)
 Vanitas (Kingdom Hearts), a character of Kingdom Hearts
 Vanitas (The Case Study of Vanitas), the main character of The Case Study of Vanitas
 Vanitas, a song by Dir En Grey off of their 2011 album, Dum Spiro Spero
 Vanitas, a song by Revocation off of their 2018 album, The Outer Ones

See also
 Vanity, one of the Seven Deadly Sins in Christian theology
 The Case Study of Vanitas, a manga series